KSJR-FM (90.1 FM) is a radio station licensed to Collegeville, Minnesota, and serving the St. Cloud area. The station is owned by Minnesota Public Radio (MPR), and airs MPR's "Classical Music Network," originating from the Twin Cities. The station has inserts at least once an hour for local underwriting and weather.

KSJR was the birthplace of MPR.  It signed on from the campus of Saint John's University on January 22, 1967.  However, it soon became apparent that the station needed to reach the Twin Cities, an hour southeast, if it had any chance of surviving, as the St. Cloud/Stearns County area was not nearly large enough for the station to be viable.  KSJR tripled its power in hopes of reaching the valuable Twin Cities market.  Even then, it barely covered Minneapolis and missed St. Paul.  The station's young general manager, Bill Kling, then persuaded Saint John's to sign on a repeater for the Twin Cities, KSJN.  By 1969, however, the operation was still awash in debt, so Saint John's transferred the stations to a nonprofit corporation that evolved into Minnesota Public Radio.

MPR moved its headquarters to St. Paul in 1971, and KSJR eventually reduced its power to normal levels as KSJN became the flagship station. MPR still maintains and office and studio space on the St. John's campus in Collegeville.

See also Minnesota Public Radio

Translators
KSJR-FM is relayed by two additional translator stations.

References

External links
KSJR-FM page at Minnesota Public Radio

Radio stations in Minnesota
Minnesota Public Radio
Classical music radio stations in the United States
NPR member stations
Radio stations established in 1967
Radio stations in St. Cloud, Minnesota